Shahpur Jan (also Romanized as Shāhpūr Jān and Shāhpūrjān; also known as Shāpūr Jān) is a village in Qarah Bagh Rural District, in the Central District of Shiraz County, Fars Province, Iran. At the 2006 census, its population was 2,860, in 648 families.

References 

Populated places in Shiraz County